The 1952–53 NBA season was the seventh season of the National Basketball Association. The season ended with the Minneapolis Lakers winning the NBA Championship, beating the New York Knicks 4 games to 1 in the NBA Finals.

Notable occurrences 
 The 1953 NBA All-Star Game was played in Fort Wayne, Indiana, with the West beating the East 79–75. George Mikan of the Minneapolis Lakers won the game's MVP award.
 Don Meineke of the Fort Wayne Pistons wins the inaugural Rookie of the Year award.

Final standings

Eastern Division

Western Division

x – clinched playoff spot

Playoffs

Statistics leaders

Note: Prior to the 1969–70 season, league leaders in points, rebounds, and assists were determined by totals rather than averages.

NBA awards
Rookie of the Year: Don Meineke, Fort Wayne Pistons

All-NBA First Team:
George Mikan, Minneapolis Lakers
Neil Johnston, Philadelphia Warriors
Bob Cousy, Boston Celtics
Ed Macauley, Boston Celtics
Dolph Schayes, Syracuse Nationals

All-NBA Second Team:
Bob Davies, Rochester Royals
Vern Mikkelsen, Minneapolis Lakers
Andy Phillip, Philadelphia Warriors
Bill Sharman, Boston Celtics
Bobby Wanzer, Rochester Royals

References
1952–53 NBA Season Summary basketball-reference.com. Retrieved December 10, 2010